Timote is a locality in Carlos Tejedor County, Buenos Aires Province, Argentina.

Timote may also refer to:

 Timote language, spoken by the Timote people
 Timotean languages, of which the Timote language is one
 Timote people, in the Venezuelan Andes
 Timote Gabashvili (1703–1764), Georgian travel writer, traveler, diplomat, cartographer, religious and public figure
 Timote Moleni (born 1975), Tongan footballer

See also
 

Language and nationality disambiguation pages